is a Japanese animated film produced by Seitaro Kitayama in 1918. The film is an adaptation of a folk tale Urashima Tarō about a fisherman traveling to an underwater world on a turtle. It premiered in February 1918, making it one of the earliest anime films.

It is a lost film; it was thought to have been discovered at a flea market at the Shitennō-ji temple in Osaka in 2007, but the discovered film later turned out to be another unknown work because a plot description and a series of stills of the 1918 film that differed considerably from the discovered film were found in a contemporary magazine.

References

External links

 

1918 animated films
1910s anime films
Films based on folklore
1910s animated short films
Anime short films
Articles containing video clips
Japanese silent films
Japanese black-and-white films
Lost animated films
1918 lost films
1918 films
Isekai anime and manga
1918 short films